Craig Henighan is a Canadian-American sound editor and engineer. He was nominated for an Academy Award in the category Best Sound for the film Roma. Henighan also won five Primetime Emmy Awards and was nominated for four more in the categories Outstanding Sound Editing and Outstanding Sound Mixing for his work on the television programs Stranger Things and Love, Death & Robots.

Selected filmography 
 Roma (2018; co-nominated with Skip Lievsay and José Antonio Garcia)

References

External links 

Living people
Place of birth missing (living people)
Year of birth missing (living people)
Canadian emigrants to the United States
American audio engineers
Canadian audio engineers
American sound editors
Canadian sound editors
21st-century American engineers
21st-century Canadian engineers
Primetime Emmy Award winners
Sheridan College alumni
Best Sound Editing Genie and Canadian Screen Award winners